In graph theory, a quiver is a directed graph where loops and multiple arrows between two vertices are allowed, i.e. a multidigraph. They are commonly used in representation theory: a representation  of a quiver assigns a vector space  to each vertex  of the quiver and a linear map  to each arrow .

In category theory, a quiver can be understood to be the underlying structure of a category, but without composition or a designation of identity morphisms. Its left adjoint is a free functor which, from a quiver, makes the corresponding free category.

Definition

A quiver  consists of:
 The set  of vertices of 
 The set  of edges of 
 Two functions:  giving the start or source of the edge, and another function,  giving the target of the edge.

This definition is identical to that of a multidigraph.

A morphism of quivers is defined as follows.

That is,

and

Category-theoretic definition
The above definition is based in set theory; the category-theoretic definition generalizes this into a functor from the free quiver  to the category of sets.

A quiver is then a functor 

 objects are functors 
 morphisms are natural transformations between functors.

Note that  is the category of presheaves on the opposite category .

Path algebra

If  is a field then the quiver algebra or  path algebra  is defined as a vector space having all the paths (of length ≥ 0) in the quiver as basis (including, for each vertex  of the quiver , a trivial path  of length 0; these paths are not assumed to be equal for different ), and multiplication given by concatenation of paths. If two paths cannot be concatenated because the end vertex of the first is not equal to the starting vertex of the second, their product is defined to be zero. This algebra has a unit element if and only if the quiver has only finitely many vertices.

Representations of quivers 

A representation  of a quiver  is said to be trivial if  for all vertices  in .

A morphism, is an isomorphism, if  is invertible for all vertices  in the quiver. With these definitions the representations of a quiver form a category.

A representation is said to be decomposable if it is isomorphic to the direct sum of non-zero representations.

A categorical definition of a quiver representation can also be given. The quiver itself can be considered a category, where the vertices are objects and paths are morphisms.

For a finite quiver  (a quiver with finitely many vertices and edges), let  be its path algebra. Let  denote the trivial path at vertex . Then we can associate to the vertex  the projective -module  consisting of linear combinations of paths which have starting vertex . To each edge joining two copies of  we associate the identity map.

Quiver with relations 
To enforce commutativity of some squares inside a quiver a generalization is the notion of quivers with relations (also named bound quivers).
A quiver with relation is a pair  with  a quiver and  an
ideal of the path algebra.

Quiver Variety

Given the dimensions of the vector spaces assigned to every vertex, one can form a variety which characterizes all representations of that quiver with those specified dimensions, and consider stability conditions.

Gabriel's theorem 

A quiver is of finite type if it has only finitely many isomorphism classes of indecomposable representations.  classified all quivers of finite type, and also their indecomposable representations. More precisely, Gabriel's theorem states that:

 A (connected) quiver is of finite type if and only if its underlying graph (when the directions of the arrows are ignored) is one of the ADE Dynkin diagrams: .
 The indecomposable representations are in a one-to-one correspondence with the positive roots of the root system of the Dynkin diagram.

 found a generalization of Gabriel's theorem in which all Dynkin diagrams of finite dimensional semisimple Lie algebras occur.

See also 

 ADE classification
 Adhesive category
 Graph algebra
 Group ring
 Incidence algebra
 Quiver diagram
 Semi-invariant of a quiver
Toric variety
Derived noncommutative algebraic geometry - Quivers help encode the data of derived noncommutative schemes

References

Books

Lecture Notes 

Quiver representations in toric geometry

Research 

 Projective toric varieties as fine moduli spaces of quiver representations

Sources

 

 
. Errata.
   
 
 
Bernšteĭn, I. N.; Gelʹfand, I. M.; Ponomarev, V. A., "Coxeter functors, and Gabriel's theorem" (Russian), Uspekhi Mat. Nauk 28 (1973), no. 2(170), 19–33. Translation on Bernstein's website.
 

Category theory
Representation theory
Directed graphs